The Champions Classic is an event that tips off the NCAA Division I men's basketball season. It features four of the top college basketball programs in the United States: Duke, Kansas, Kentucky, and Michigan State. The venue changes from year to year, with Madison Square Garden being the first venue. The first Classic was held on November 15, 2011. This would be the beginning of a three-year rotation, originally scheduled to end in 2013, where each of the teams would play each other once. The event is televised on ESPN. The series is set to run through 2025.

The series was started as an early-season match-up of the nation's best and most consistent basketball programs as evidenced by the fact that all four teams have been ranked for every competition except on three occasions, Michigan State in 2011, 2021, and 2022. The schools have combined for 9 National Championships, 37 Final Fours, and 21 National Championship game appearances since 1988. Three of the four teams from the 2014 event advanced to the 2015 Final Four (Duke, Kentucky, and Michigan State) with Duke winning the National Championship that year.  The 2019 games featured the schools ranked first, second, third, and fourth in both the AP and Coaches polls. From 2017 to 2021, all four teams were coached by members of the Naismith Memorial Basketball Hall of Fame; Bill Self of Kansas was the last of the four coaches inducted in 2017, Mike Krzyzewski retired at the end of the 2021–22 season.

As of the conclusion of the 2022 games, Duke and Kansas have the best record in the champions classic at 7–5, followed by Kentucky and Michigan State at 5–7. Each team has at least one victory over each team in the classic, and Kansas is the only team that does not have a losing record to one of the other three teams.

Game results
Rankings are based on the Associated Press poll. 

  Due to the COVID-19 pandemic and conflicting safety protocols between the various conferences, Michigan State played its Champions Classic game at Duke while Kentucky and Kansas played in Indianapolis.
  No attendance due to COVID-19 pandemic.

Future match-ups

Head-to-head records

References

College men's basketball competitions in the United States
College basketball competitions
Recurring sporting events established in 2011